"She'll Never Know" is a song written by Rick Hall and performed by Brenda Lee.  The song reached #15 on the adult contemporary chart and #47 on the Billboard Hot 100 in 1963.

References

1963 songs
1963 singles
Brenda Lee songs
Decca Records singles
Songs written by Rick Hall